The Federation may refer to:

 Federation of Bosnia and Herzegovina, often just called "The Federation", a part of the country of Bosnia and Herzegovina
 Russian Federation
 United Federation of Planets, a fictional alliance in the Star Trek universe often referred to as "The Federation"
 The Federation (Shannara), fictional country from the Shannara series by Terry Brooks
 The Federation (band), a Bay Area hip hop group
 Federation (information technology), a group of computing or network providers agreeing upon standards of operation in a collective fashion

See also
 Federation (disambiguation)